Loropetalum chinense is commonly known as loropetalum, Chinese fringe flower and strap flower.  Two forms of L. chinense exist; a white- (to pale-yellow-) flowering green-leafed variety and a pink-flowering variety with leaves varying from bronze-red when new to olive-green or burgundy when mature, depending on selection and growing conditions.

They are evergreen with branches forming horizontal layers.

Cultivation and uses
Loropetalum chinense grows best in fertile, slightly acidic soil in full sun for deepest foliage colour and is hardy down to -15 degrees Celsius (5 degrees Fahrenheit). It is a popular ornamental plant, grown for its prolific clusters of flowers and (in the case of the pink flowering variety) deeply coloured foliage that may contain various green, copper, purple and red tones.  The leaves, flowers and roots of L. chinense are all used in traditional Chinese medicine.

Cultivars
Loropetalum chinense 'Pizazz'
Loropetalum chinense 'Rubrum'
Loropetalum chinense 'Ruby'
Loropetalum chinense var. rubrum 'Blush'
Loropetalum chinense var. rubrum 'Burgundy'
Loropetalum chinense var. rubrum 'Fire Dance'
Loropetalum chinense var. rubrum 'Hines Purpleleaf'
Loropetalum chinense var. rubrum 'Purple Majesty'
Loropetalum chinense var. rubrum 'Raspberry Fringe'
Loropetalum chinense var. rubrum 'Razzle-Dazzle'
Loropetalum chinense var. rubrum 'Zhuzhou Fuchsia'
Loropetalum chinense Black Pearl (PBR)
Loropetalum chinense 'Chang Nian Hong'
Loropetalum chinense 'China Pink'
Loropetalum chinense 'Emerald Snow'
Loropetalum chinense Ever Red
Loropetalum chinense 'Griffcrl'
Loropetalum chinense Hot Spice
Loropetalum chinense 'Ming Dynasty'
Loropetalum chinense 'Nci 002'
Loropetalum chinense 'Rose Blush'
Loropetalum chinense 'Snowdance'
Loropetalum chinense 'Song'
Loropetalum chinense 'Tang Dynasty'
Loropetalum chinense var. rubrum 'Fire Glow'
Loropetalum chinense var. rubrum 'Monraz'
Loropetalum chinense var. rubrum 'Pearl'(PBR)
Loropetalum chinense var. rubrum 'Pipa's Red'
Loropetalum chinense var. rubrum 'Daybreak's Flame'
Loropetalum chinense 'Dazzle'
Loropetalum chinense 'Peack'
Loropetalum chinense var. rubrum 'Purple Pixie'
Loropetalum chinense var. rubrum 'Shang-hi'
Loropetalum chinense var. rubrum 'Shang-lo'
Loropetalum chinense ‘Shang-Red’

Gallery

References

Hamamelidaceae
Taxa named by Daniel Oliver
Taxa named by Robert Brown (botanist, born 1773)